This is a list of notable card "dedicated deck" games, which use neither standard playing cards nor collectible trading cards.

References